Kevin Foxx (born in Montreal, Quebec) is a Canadian comedian and radio host. He is best known as the host of the radio program The Kevin Foxx Show on CFRB in Toronto, Ontario.

Foxx performs regularly at comedy clubs across the country. He recently filmed his own one-hour special for CTV and The Comedy Network. He has done several stand-up performances for Madly Off in All Directions on CBC Radio, the Halifax Comedy Festival, Comedy at Club 54, Just for Laughs and the Global Comedy Festival.

External links
Kevin Foxx
http://www.straight.com/article/canwest-comedy-fest

1970 births
Canadian radio personalities
Canadian male comedians
Comedians from Montreal
Anglophone Quebec people
Living people
Canadian people of Irish descent